USS Egret (AMc-24) was an Egret-class coastal minesweeper acquired by the U.S. Navy for the dangerous task of removing mines from minefields laid in the water to prevent ships from passing.

World War II service 

The first ship to be named Egret by the Navy, AMc-24 was placed in service 10 June 1941 and during World War II served in the 4th Naval District and in the Potomac River Naval Command. She was reclassified IX-181, 17 July 1944.

Egret was transferred to the Maritime Commission for disposal 17 June 1946.

References

External links 
 NavSource Online: Mine Warfare Vessel Photo Archive - Egret (IX 181) - ex-AMc-24

Minesweepers of the United States Navy
World War II mine warfare vessels of the United States